This list of national quality awards is an index to articles about notable national awards for quality, typically associated with business and manufacturing.

Background

A national quality award is typically part of a larger effort by a government to make its country's businesses more competitive in the world economy.  The awarding institutions are generally either government departments or ministries or not-for-profit organizations with government ties.  In many countries, however, the awarding institutions are consortia of businesses.  Candidate companies compete in award-specific assessments of business quality and excellence criteria.  The assessments are annual and firms who wish to be considered for the awards file applications with the organization that conducts the competition in their home country. Competitors are evaluated by teams of examiners who are volunteers in Germany, the United Kingdom, the United States, and possibly elsewhere. Several examiners separately evaluate company submissions against award criteria after which they meet to discuss their findings and to agree on a  consensus score.  The highest scoring firms advance to the next phase where examiners perform site visits to compare actual practices against those reported in the company submission and finally, awards are given to companies whose practices best fulfill the criteria of the award models.

While each nation's awards programs only consider businesses within its national borders, there are two notable exceptions:  The EFQM Excellence Award is a transnational award open to businesses operating in one or more European countries and the Deming Prize, which began as the Japan Quality Medal, became the first (and as of 2014 the only) global quality award in 1984.

The most widely recognized quality awards are the Deming Prize (the first of its kind) and the EFQM Excellence and Malcolm Baldrige National Quality Awards (due to their size).  The national quality award phenomenon grew out of the Total Quality Management movement of the 1980s.

Awards

See also
:Category:Business and industry awards
Global Competitiveness Report
List of business and industry awards
Total quality management

Notes

References

External links
The Chartered Quality Institute's fact sheet on quality awards

quality awards
 
national quality awards